Lepipaschia inornata is a species of snout moth in the genus Lepipaschia. It was described by Jay C. Shaffer and Maria Alma Solis in 1994, and is known from the Aldabra Atoll and Madagascar.

References

Moths described in 1994
Epipaschiinae
Moths of Madagascar
Fauna of Seychelles
Moths of Africa